Daisy Maud Bellis (February 16, 1887 – 1971) was an American painter.

Bellis was a native of Waltham, Massachusetts; her birthplace has also been given as Branford, Connecticut, where she later lived. She studied at the Massachusetts College of Art, the University of Vermont, and the Breckenridge School of Painting, and had further lessons at institutions in Montreal and Paris.

She was elected a Fellow of the Royal Society of Arts in 1936. Bellis was involved with the Works Progress Administration for some of her career, painting around eighty pieces for the Federal Arts Project; these were executed mainly in oils and watercolor, and were parceled out to the Laurel Heights, Undercliff, and Cedarcrest Sanatoria, the Connecticut State Farm for Women at Niantic, the Middlesex County Temporary Home, and Fairfield Hills Hospital. She also taught art under the auspices of the WPA. During her career she also taught art at Salem College and at Macdonald College of McGill University. The Connecticut State Library has cataloged much of her work.

References

1887 births
1971 deaths
American women painters
20th-century American painters
20th-century American women artists
People from Waltham, Massachusetts
People from Branford, Connecticut
Painters from Massachusetts
Painters from Connecticut
Works Progress Administration in Connecticut
Federal Art Project artists
Massachusetts College of Art and Design alumni
University of Vermont alumni
Salem College faculty
Academic staff of McGill University
American women academics